The İstanbul Toy Museum is a toy museum located in the Göztepe neighbourhood of Kadıköy district in İstanbul, Turkey.

The museum was founded by the Turkish poet and novelist, Sunay Akın, in 2005. The museum opened on April 23, a national holiday in Turkey, National Sovereignty and Children's Day. Currently, the museum has on display 4,000 toys and miniatures from Turkey and abroad; many of the exhibits are antiques, some of which date back nearly 200 years. The first floor of the museum is the site of the Eyüp Toy Shop, a famous toy shop that closed down in the 1950s.

In 2012, the museum was nominated and shortlisted for the annual European Museum Academy Children’s Museum Award.

The museum is open weekdays (except Mondays), 9:30-18:00, and weekends, 9:30-19:00. It is located at Ömerpaşa Caddesi, Dr. Zeki Zeren Sokak 17, Göztepe-Kadıköy, Istanbul.

Gallery

References

External links

 Official website

Museums established in 2005
Toy Museum
Toy museums
Doll museums
2005 establishments in Turkey
Kadıköy